Patrick Gohé (born 27 March 1997) is a New Caledonian international footballer who plays as a midfielder for New Caledonia Super Ligue side AS Lössi.

Career statistics

International

References

1997 births
Living people
New Caledonian footballers
New Caledonia international footballers
Association football midfielders
AS Lössi players
Gaïtcha FCN players